Roderick Syme  (24 February 1900 – 2 May 1994) was a notable New Zealand agricultural instructor, mountaineer, conservationist and alpine sports administrator. He was born in Hawera, New Zealand, in 1900. In 1931, he climbed a new ridge route on Mount Tasman. The ridge now bears Syme's name. In 1931, he also won the New Zealand long-distance skiing championship.

In the 1955 Queen's Birthday Honours, Syme was appointed a Member of the Order of the British Empire, for services as an agricultural instructor and in fostering mountaineering.

References

1900 births
1994 deaths
New Zealand mountain climbers
New Zealand sports executives and administrators
New Zealand conservationists
People from Hāwera
New Zealand Members of the Order of the British Empire